Mercedes is a municipality in the Honduran department of Ocotepeque.

Demographics
At the time of the 2013 Honduras census, Mercedes municipality had a population of 7,226. Of these, 99.32% were Mestizo, 0.30% Indigenous, 0.30% Black or Afro-Honduran and 0.06% White.

References

Municipalities of the Ocotepeque Department